Edward or Eddie Forrest may refer to:

Edward Barrow Forrest (1838–1914), Australian company director and Queensland politician
Eddie Forrest (American football) (1921–2001), played two seasons with the San Francisco 49ers
Eddie Forrest (born 1978), Scottish footballer